Jules Nehemiah Heningburg (born May 3, 1996) is an American professional lacrosse player on the Redwoods Lacrosse Club of the Premier Lacrosse League and Albany FireWolves of the National Lacrosse League. He played college lacrosse at Rutgers University where he was a two-time All-Big Ten selection and All-American (2018 Second Team, 2017 Honorable Mention). Heningburg was selected 7th overall in the first round of the 2018 Major League Lacrosse Draft by the Florida Launch.

Early life and college
Heningburg grew up in Maplewood, New Jersey as the fifth of six children of a Black father, Gus Heningburg Jr., and a white mother, Maria Morrison Heningburg. His grandfather, Gus Sr., was a civil rights activist, while his grandmother, Jean, was the first Black teacher at Montclair High School. He played high school lacrosse for Columbia High School before transferring to Seton Hall Preparatory School.  He chose to keep his lacrosse talent in New Jersey for college, heading to Rutgers University. In his four years with the Scarlet Knights, Heningburg started all 60 games he appeared in.

Professional Field Lacrosse Career

2018: Florida Launch
Heningburg was drafted 7th overall by the Florida Launch in the 2018 Major League Lacrosse Draft. He made 8 regular season appearances. With Jules joining approximately 140 other players leaving the MLL to sign with the PLL, the MLL was forced to contract the league footprint. As a result, the Launch franchise folded during the 2019 MLL offseason.

2019: Whipsnakes Lacrosse Club
Heningburg left the MLL for the PLL in the upstart league's first season. At the inception of the Premier Lacrosse League, Heningburg was assigned to the Whipsnakes roster.  The inaugural 2019 season began on June 1, and Heningburg saw action in three games for the Whipsnakes before being traded to the Redwoods on June 17 in exchange for Alec Tulett and a fourth round draft pick in 2020.

2019–present: Redwoods Lacrosse Club
Heningburg currently plays for the Redwoods of the Premier Lacrosse League. He finished his first season with 33 regular season points and helped steer the Redwoods to the championship game were the Redwoods fell to Heningburg's former team, the Whipsnakes, by a score of 12-11 in overtime. During the 2020 off-season, the Redwoods used one of their protected roster spots to keep Heningburg from being selected in the Expansion Draft by the Waterdogs Lacrosse Club. During the COVID-19 shortened 2020 Premier Lacrosse League season, it was revealed by league doctors that Heningburg would have to sit out the bubble championship series due to an underlying health condition.

Professional Box Lacrosse Career

2019: San Diego Seals and IBLA
Heningburg was promoted to the San Diego Seals active roster from the practice squad on February 8, 2019. He appeared in one game. That summer, he worked to improve his indoor lacrosse game in the Interstate Box Lacrosse Association (IBLA). Heningburg was a staple of the Minneapolis Wheat Kings's run to third place in the IBLA Nationals Tournament in Huntington Beach, California.

2020-present: New England Black Wolves and Albany FireWolves
Heningburg returned to the National Lacrosse League in September 2020 on a contract with the New England Black Wolves. In February 2021, the Black Wolves announced a move to Albany with new ownership.

Statistics
Source:

MLL

PLL

NLL

NCAA

Personal life
Heningburg is a founding member of the Black Lacrosse Alliance, which seeks to "push the culture of lacrosse forward to become more inclusive and inspire a more diverse generation of lacrosse players."

References

1996 births
Living people
Major League Lacrosse players
Premier Lacrosse League players
National Lacrosse League players
American lacrosse players
Lacrosse players from New Jersey
People from Maplewood, New Jersey
Seton Hall Preparatory School alumni
Sportspeople from Essex County, New Jersey
Lacrosse forwards
Rutgers Scarlet Knights men's lacrosse players
Florida Launch players
San Diego Seals players
New England Black Wolves players